The Ministry of Overseas Indian Affairs (MOIA) was a ministry of the Government of India. It was dedicated to all matters relating to the Indian diaspora around the world.

History
Ministry was established in May 2004 as the Ministry of Non-Resident Indians' Affairs. It was renamed as the Ministry of Overseas Indian Affairs (MOIA) in September 2004.

Positioned as a ‘Services’ Ministry, it provided information, partnerships and facilitations for all matters related to Overseas Indians: Non-Resident Indian and Person of Indian Origin.

The Ministry was merged with the Ministry of External Affairs on 7 January 2016. The government said that the decision was taken in line with government's "overall objective of minimizing government and maximizing governance" and that it will help the government address duplication as well as unnecessary delays.

Structure
The Ministry had four functional service divisions to handle its services:
Diaspora Services
Financial Services
Emigration Services
Management Services

First two divisions were headed by Joint Secretaries. The Protector General of Emigrants (PGoE) headed the Overseas Employment Services Division. The Social Services Unit and the Management Services Unit were staffed with officers of the rank of Deputy Secretary. The Information Services Unit was headed by Senior Technical Director (NIC).

The ministry also sponsored the annual Pravasi Bharatiya Divas (Non-resident Indian Day) established in 2003, when it also instituted the annual Pravasi Bharatiya Samman Award.

Ministers of Overseas Indian Affairs
The ministry has been headed by 4 ministers.

See also
 Indian diaspora
 Non-resident Indian and person of Indian origin
 Pravasi Bharatiya Samman
 Pravasi Bharatiya Divas
Mahatma Gandhi Pravasi Suraksha Yojana

References

External links
 Official website
 Previous official website archive dated 4 March 2016

Indian diaspora
Diaspora ministries
Ministry of External Affairs (India)
Defunct government ministries of India